In mathematical complex analysis, universal Teichmüller space T(1) is a Teichmüller space containing the Teichmüller space T(G) of every Fuchsian group G. It was introduced  by  as the set of boundary values of quasiconformal maps of the upper half-plane that fix 0, 1, and ∞.

References

Riemann surfaces